The Metropolitan City of Naples is an Italian metropolitan city in  Campania region, established on 1 January 2015. Its capital city is Naples; within the city there are  92 comunes (municipalities).
It was first created by the reform of local authorities (Law 142/1990) and established by Law 56/2014, thus replacing the Province of Naples in 2015.

The Metropolitan City of Naples is headed by the metropolitan mayor and the metropolitan council. Since 18 October 2021, its head has been Gaetano Manfredi, mayor of the capital city.

Demography and territory

The city is 96th out of 110 Italian provinces and metropolitan cities by landmass, with an area (1,171 km2 including islands) that is smaller than the core comune of Rome (1,287 km2). Naples is, however, Italy's third largest metropolitan city by population, making it one of the most densely populated areas in Europe; the metropolitan region also includes the municipality of Casavatore, the highest-density municipality in Italy (at 12,000 inhabitants/km2). While it contains more than half of Campania's population, it only occupies 8.6% of Campania's landmass (13,590 km2), creating a strong demographic and territorial imbalance with the other four provinces in Campania.

Municipalities (comune) in the Metropolitan City vary in size, ranging from 1.62 km2 (Casavatore) to 117.27 km2 (Naples); 60% of the municipalities are small (less than or equal to 10 km2), 36% of medium-sized (> 10 km2 and ≤ 25 km2), the rest (11%) more than 25 km2 and, of this, only two municipalities (Acerra and Giugliano) are between 50 and 100 km2 and only the municipality of Naples exceeds 100 km2.

Because of its proximity to Vesuvius and Phlegraean Fields, the city is vulnerable to seismic and volcanic activity.

Largest municipalities

Government

Metropolitan Council
Metropolitan Cities give large urban areas the administrative powers of a province, a system designed to improve local administration, create efficiency in spending, and better coordinate basic services (including transport, school and social programs) and environment protection. The Mayor of Naples thus also has powers as Metropolitan Mayor, presiding over a Metropolitan Council formed by 24 mayors of municipalities (comune) within the Metropolitan City.

The first Metropolitan Council of the City was elected on 28 September 2014.The current Metropolitan Council of the City was elected on 13 March 2022:

List of Metropolitan Mayors of Naples

References

External links 

 

 
Naples
.
Geography of Campania
 01
Provinces of Campania
States and territories established in 2015
2015 establishments in Italy